Domenico Quaglio the Elder (1723–1760) was an Italian painter. He was part of the large Quaglio pedigree of Italian artists involved in architecture, indoor fresco decoration, and scenography (stage design) for the court theaters.  He was born in Laino.

References

1723 births
1760 deaths
18th-century Italian painters
Italian male painters
Italian Baroque painters
Italian scenic designers
18th-century Italian male artists